The 1939 Florida Gators football team represented the University of Florida during the 1939 college football season. The season was the fourth and final year for Josh Cody as the head coach of the Florida Gators football team.   Cody's 1939 Florida Gators finished with a 5–5–1 overall record, but with a winless 0–3–1 record in the Southeastern Conference (SEC), placing twelfth of thirteen teams in the SEC.

Schedule

Postseason
After leaving Florida, Josh Cody would later become the long-time head coach of the Temple Owls men's basketball team and the Temple University athletic director, and was inducted into the College Football Hall of Fame as a player in 1970.

References

Florida
Florida Gators football seasons
Florida Gators football